Bhala Thandanana is a 2022 Indian Telugu-language action-thriller film directed by Chaitanya Dantluri. The film is produced by Rajani Korrapati under the banner Vaaraahi Chalana Chitram. Featuring Sree Vishnu, Catherine Tresa and Ramachandra Raju in primary roles, the film was released on 6 May 2022.

The film is edited by Marthand K. Venkatesh and the soundtrack is composed by Mani Sharma.

Plot 
Chandu (Sree Vishnu) works as an accountant in an orphanage where he meets investigative journalist Sasirekha (Catherine). Sasirekha is trying to crack a series of cold-blooded murders of people who work for Anand Bali (Garuda Ram).

Cast 
 Sree Vishnu as Chandra "Chandu" Shekar
 Catherine Tresa as Sasirekha "Sasi", investigative journalist
 Ramachandra Raju as Anand Bali
 Posani Krishna Murali as Dayamayam
 Ravi Varma as Bhadra
 Srikanth Iyengar as Sasi's brother-in-law
 Srinivasa Reddy as Murthy
 Aadarsh Balakrishna as Shafi
 Ayyappa P. Sharma as Chakri
 Satya as Balu
 Chaitanya Krishna as Ghani
 Bhupal Raju as Yadav

Production 
The film was launched with a pooja ceremony on 16 February 2021 in Hyderabad. S. S. Rajamouli and Rama Rajamouli also attended the ceremony.

Music 

The film soundtrack and score is composed by Mani Sharma.

Release  
The film was first scheduled to release on April 30, 2022 but was finally released on 6 May 2022. The film premiered on Disney+ Hotstar on 20 May 2022.

Reception 
This movie received mixed reviews

Thadhagath Pathi of The Times of India gave the film a rating of 2.5/5 and wrote "Bhala Thandanana is flawed but it doesn't leave you completely disappointed either because the performances lend some heft to this tepid film". A reviewer from Pinkvilla gave the film a rating of 2/5 and wrote "This semi-focused thriller suffers from weak plot turns".

References

External links 
 

2022 films
2020s Telugu-language films
Indian action thriller films
2022 action thriller films
Films scored by Mani Sharma
Vaaraahi Chalana Chitram films